Peterchurch railway station was a station in Peterchurch, Herefordshire, England. The station was opened in 1901, closed to passengers in 1941 and closed completely in 1953.

References

Further reading

Disused railway stations in Herefordshire
Railway stations in Great Britain opened in 1901
Railway stations in Great Britain closed in 1953
Former Great Western Railway stations